Zdeněk Sekera (3 July 1905 – 1 January 1973) was a Czech scientist who in 1966 won the American Meteorological Society's Carl-Gustaf Rossby Research Medal for atmospheric science for his research into the dynamics of the atmosphere. He was a Guggenheim Fellow in 1956 and 1960 in the fields of astronomy and astrophysics. He was professor of meteorology at the University of California, Los Angeles.

References 

1905 births
1973 deaths
Czechoslovak physicists
Charles University alumni
University of California, Los Angeles faculty
Masaryk University alumni
Academic staff of Charles University